António Casalinho (born June 14, 2003) is a Portuguese ballet dancer. He won the Youth America Grand Prix prize for his age category. In April 2017 he won the 3rd edition of the Portuguese TV show Got Talent Portugal getting a golden buzzer on every act he made. 
On July 26, 2020, António Casalinho won the 1st edition of A Batalha dos Jurados, on RTP 1.
 In July 2018 he won the gold medal at the 2018 Varna International Ballet Competition on the juniors age category.

In 2021 he won the Prix de Lausanne.

References

Portuguese male dancers
2003 births
Living people
Got Talent winners
Got Talent contestants
People from Leiria
Portuguese male ballet dancers
Prix de Lausanne winners